Singhania is an Indian family name. It may refer to:

People

 Padampat Singhania (1904–1979), Indian industrialist and politician
 Hari Shankar Singhania (1933-2013), Indian industrialist
 Gautam Singhania (b. 1965), Indian businessperson
 Vijaypat Singhania, Indian businessperson

Organizations

 Singhania University in Rajasthan, India
 Sir Padampat Singhania University in Rajasthan, India
 Smt. Sulochanadevi Singhania School in Maharashtra, India
 Lakshmipat Singhania Academy in Rajasthan and West Bengal, India
 Lady Anusuiya Singhania Education Centre in Rajasthan, India